PSTU may refer to:
Patuakhali Science and Technology University, a university in Bangladesh
Partido Socialista dos Trabalhadores Unificado (United Socialist Workers' Party), a Brazilian political party
Partido Socialista de los Trabajadores Unificado (United Socialist Workers' Party (Argentina)), an Argentine political party
Perm State Technical University, a university in Perm, Russia
Potti Sreeramulu Telugu University, a university in India